Red Wagon may refer to:

 Red Wagon (novel), a 1930 novel by the British writer Lady Eleanor Smith
 Red Wagon (film), a 1933 British film adaptation directed by Paul L. Stein